The Public and Allied Workers Union of South Africa (PAWUSA) is a trade union for public sector workers in South Africa. It is affiliated with the Congress of South African Trade Unions (COSATU).

External links
 Website of the organisation.

Congress of South African Trade Unions
Trade unions in South Africa